14 Persei is a single star in the northern constellation Perseus, located roughly 1,900 light years away from the Sun. It is visible to the naked eye as a faint, yellow-hued star with an apparent visual magnitude is 5.43. The object is slowly moving closer to the Earth with a heliocentric radial velocity of −1.2 km/s.

The spectral classification of 14 Persei is as a G0 yellow supergiant, but in other respects it appears to be a giant star. Other analyses of the spectrum give a class of G0Ib. Stellar models of 14 Persei yield an estimated mass four times that of the Sun and an age of 162 million years. It has expanded to 57 times the Sun's radius and has a projected rotational velocity of 8.7 km/s. The star is radiating 372 times as much luminosity compared to the Sun from its enlarged photosphere at an effective temperature of 5,624 K.

14 Persei has been calculated to lie within the Cepheid instability strip although it is not considered to be variable.  Uncertainty in the absolute magnitude means that the star may actually lie near the instability strip but not on it.  Small periodic radial velocity variations are seen, but an order of magnitude or more smaller than for Cepheid variables and with longer periods than would be expected for pulsations. The cause of the radial velocity changes and the difference between variable and non-variable stars within the instability strip is unknown.

References

Perseus (constellation)
Persei, 14
G-type supergiants
0800
016901
012768
BD+43 566